Fabrice Guerrier is a Haitian-American science fiction and fantasy writer. He is the founder of the sci-fi and fantasy production house, Syllble. The Root Magazine described the writer and founder as using "...the internet to create a social, political and intellectual explosion similar to the Harlem Renaissance."

He is a columnist for Haiti Observateur, a newspaper based in Brooklyn, New York. He writes on Haitian Futurism. In 2020, he was named to the Forbes 30 Under 30 list. In 2021, he was named to The Root's 100 Most Influential African Americans in the United States between the ages of 25 to 45 in the "Arts" category.

Early life

Guerrier was born in Port-au-Prince, Haiti, in 1991, and emigrated to Coral Springs, Florida, with his family at the age of 13, the same year as the 2004 Haitian coup d'état. He graduated from Florida State University (FSU) with a BA in International Relations and from Eastern Mennonite University's (EMU) Center for Justice and Peacebuilding with an MA in Conflict Transformation. While at FSU, Guerrier founded the LEEHG Institute, a student-run think tank, and became a member of the Theta Chi Fraternity.

Career

In 2015, Guerrier was named the PEN Haiti Fellow at PEN America. He traveled to Port-au-Prince, Haiti to work at the PEN Haiti Center with Haitian poets, writers and journalists.

In 2016, he worked at the U.S Department of State in Washington D.C.

In 2017, Guerrier was appointed National President of the racial reconciliation organization Coming to the Table, founded by both black and white linked descendants of Thomas Jefferson and Sally Hemings, the woman he enslaved on his Monticello plantation.

In 2018, Guerrier gave a keynote talk at TEDx Florida State University titled "Gone Are The Days Of The Lone Genius."

In 2020, After writing The Future Manifesto, Guerrier started The Fabrice Guerrier Show, a podcast that explores the future of humanity. He has interviewed prominent global leaders such as American author Seth Godin, American space scientist Moriba Jah, Haitian-american author Edwidge Danticat, Libya's first female Foreign Minister Najla Mangoush, British academic china scholar Kerry Brown, and more.

Syllble

In 2018, Guerrier founded Syllble, the first science fiction and fantasy production house with the aim to bring more access to underrepresented writers and creative voices from around the world and in the entertainment business.

In October 2020, Syllble partnered with Moko Magazine Caribbean Arts and Letters to establish the Caribbean Sky Islands fictional world and publish stories from Black Caribbean speculative fiction writers.

In May 2021, Guerrier collaborated with The Innovation Station: Creative Industry Lab at the U.S. State Department to bring science fiction writers from around the world to solve some of the worlds toughest global challenges through the One Humanity Writing Collective.

In February 2022, Syllble partnered with Brittle Paper magazine to establish the first collaborative African fantasy universe called Sauúti.

In July 2022, Hollywood executive and film producer Sandy Climan joined Syllble's Advisory Board.

Awards and honors
 2015: "Humanity in Action" Fellowship
 2016: PEN America's PEN Haiti Fellow
 2018: "Global Shaper" at World Economic Forum
 2018: "Shafik Gabr Fellow" at the Shafik Gabr Foundation
 2021: Forbes "30 Under 30"
 2021: "The Root" 100 List of Most Influential African Americans
 2022: PEN America's "Emerging Voices Fellow Finalist"

Bibliography

Fiction books
 Golden Veins (September 2019)

Non-fiction Books
 Breaking Free From Mass-Produced Consciousness: A Little Book for Artists, Entrepreneurs, and the Leaders of Tomorrow (September 2021)

Poetry books
  Egypt in a Cup of Tea  (February 2019)

Anthologies
  Slavery's Descendants: Shared Legacies of Race and Reconciliation  (May 2019)

Short Fiction
 Magic Mangoes   (December 2021)
  Dawn of the Sun  (December 2021)
 Bionic Man (September 2018)

References 

Science fiction writers
1991 births
Living people